Thanasis Khouliaras (born 10 May 1949) is a Greek boxer. He competed in the men's bantamweight event at the 1976 Summer Olympics. In his opening fight, he lost to Chul Soon-hwang of South Korea.

References

External links
 

1949 births
Living people
Greek male boxers
Olympic boxers of Greece
Boxers at the 1976 Summer Olympics
People from Phthiotis
Bantamweight boxers
Sportspeople from Central Greece
20th-century Greek people